Paddy Kennedy may refer to:

 Paddy Kennedy (politician) (1942–1999), Northern Irish politician
 Paddy Kennedy (Down Gaelic footballer), 1991 All Star winner
 Paddy Kennedy (Kerry Gaelic footballer) (1917–1979), Kerry Gaelic football player
 Paddy Kennedy (Sligo Gaelic footballer) (1926–2011), Sligo Gaelic football player
 Paddy Kennedy (association footballer) (1934–2007), Irish footballer with Manchester United, Blackburn Rovers and Southampton

See also
 Patrick Kennedy (disambiguation)
 Paddy Kenny (born 1978), football goalkeeper